The sunangels are a genus of hummingbirds, Heliangelus, found in montane South America. The genus contains the following nine species:
 Orange-throated sunangel (Heliangelus mavors)
 Amethyst-throated sunangel (Heliangelus amethysticollis)
 Longuemare's sunangel (Heliangelus clarisse)
 Mérida sunangel (Heliangelus spencei)
 Gorgeted sunangel (Heliangelus strophianus)
 Tourmaline sunangel (Heliangelus exortis)
 Flame-throated sunangel (Heliangelus micraster)
 Purple-throated sunangel (Heliangelus viola)
 Royal sunangel (Heliangelus regalis)

The Bogotá sunangel was formerly placed in this genus. It is regarded as a hybrid specimen by the  International Ornithologists' Union based on a study published in 2018 by Jorge Pérez-Emán and colleagues.

References

 
Taxonomy articles created by Polbot